Nassau County is an affluent inner suburban county located on Long Island, immediately to the east of New York City. As of the 2020 United States Census, Nassau County's population was 1,395,774, reflecting an increase of 56,242 (+4.2%) from the 1,339,532 residents enumerated at the 2010 U.S. Census. Nassau's county seat is Mineola, while the county's largest town is Hempstead.

Nassau County is situated on western Long Island, bordering New York City's borough of Queens to its west, and Long Island's Suffolk County to its east. It is the most densely populated and second-most populous county in the State of New York outside of New York City, with which it maintains extensive rail and highway connectivity, and is considered one of the central counties within the New York metropolitan area. Nassau County contains two cities, three towns, 64 incorporated villages, and more than 60 unincorporated hamlets. Nassau County has a designated police department, fire commission, and elected executive and legislative bodies.

A 2012 Forbes article based on the American Community Survey reported Nassau County as the most expensive county and one of the highest income counties in the U.S., and the most affluent in New York state, with four of the nation's top ten towns by median income located in the county. As of 2023, the median home price in Nassau County is approximately US$700,000, and the Gold Coast of Nassau County features some of the world's most expensive real estate. Nassau County high school students often feature prominently as winners of the International Science and Engineering Fair and similar STEM-based academic awards. Cold Spring Harbor Laboratory in the Town of Oyster Bay; the Old Westbury campus of New York Institute of Technology; Hofstra University School of Medicine in the Village of Hempstead; and the Feinstein Institutes for Medical Research in Manhasset, are prominent life sciences research and academic institutions in Nassau County.

Etymology
The name of Nassau County originated from an old name for Long Island, which was at one time named Nassau, after the Dutch family of King William III of England, the House of Nassau, itself named for the German town of Nassau. The county colors (orange and blue) are also the colors of the House of Orange-Nassau.

Several alternate names had been considered for the county, including "Bryant," "Matinecock" (a village within the county currently has that name), "Norfolk" (presumably because of the proximity to Suffolk County), and "Sagamore." However, "Nassau" had the historical advantage of having at one time been the name of Long Island itself, and was the name most mentioned after the new county was proposed in 1875.

History
The area now designated as Nassau County was originally the eastern 70% of Queens County, one of the original twelve counties formed in 1683, and was then contained within two towns: Hempstead and Oyster Bay. In 1784, the Town of North Hempstead, was formed through secession by the northern portions of the Town of Hempstead. Nassau County was formed in 1899 by the division of Queens County, after the western portion of Queens had become a borough of New York City in 1898, as the three easternmost towns seceded from the county.

When the first European settlers arrived, among the Native Americans to occupy the present area of Nassau County were the Marsapeque, Matinecoc, and Sacatogue. Dutch settlers in New Netherland predominated in the western portion of Long Island, while English settlers from Connecticut occupied the eastern portion. Until 1664, Long Island was split, roughly at the present border between Nassau and Suffolk counties, between the Dutch in the west and Connecticut claiming the east. The Dutch did grant an English settlement in Hempstead (now in western Nassau), but drove settlers from the present-day eastern Nassau hamlet of Oyster Bay as part of a boundary dispute. In 1664, all of Long Island became part of the English Province of New York within the Shire of York. Present-day Queens and Nassau were then just part of a larger North Riding. In 1683, the colonial territory of Yorkshire was dissolved, Suffolk County and Queens County were established, and the local seat of government was moved west from Hempstead to Jamaica (now in New York City).

By 1700, virtually none of Long Island's area remained unpurchased from the Native Americans by the English colonists, and townships controlled whatever land had not already been distributed. The courthouse in Jamaica was torn down by the British during the American Revolution to use the materials to build barracks.

In 1784, following the American Revolutionary War, the Town of Hempstead was split in two, when Patriots in the northern part formed the new Town of North Hempstead, leaving Loyalist majorities in the Town of Hempstead. About 1787, a new Queens County Courthouse was erected (and later completed) in the new Town of North Hempstead, near present-day Mineola (now in Nassau County), known then as Clowesville.

The Long Island Rail Road reached as far east as Hicksville in 1837, but did not proceed to Farmingdale until 1841 due to the Panic of 1837. The 1850 census was the first in which the population of the three western towns (Flushing, Jamaica, and Newtown) exceeded that of the three eastern towns that are now part of Nassau County. Concerns were raised about the condition of the old courthouse and the inconvenience of travel and accommodations, with the three eastern and three western towns divided on the location for the construction of a new one. Around 1874, the seat of county government was moved to Long Island City from Mineola. As early as 1875, representatives of the three eastern towns began advocating the separation of the three eastern towns from Queens, with some proposals also including the towns of Huntington and Babylon (in Suffolk County).

In 1898, the western portion of Queens County became a borough of the City of Greater New York, leaving the eastern portion a part of Queens County but not part of the Borough of Queens. As part of the city consolidation plan, all town, village, and city (other than NYC) governments within the borough were dissolved, as well as the county government with its seat in Jamaica. The areas excluded from the consolidation included all of the Town of North Hempstead, all of the Town of Oyster Bay, and most of the Town of Hempstead (excluding the Rockaway Peninsula, which was separated from the Town of Hempstead and became part of the city borough).
In 1899, following approval from the New York State Legislature, the three towns were separated from Queens County, and the new county of Nassau was constituted.

In preparation for the new county, in November 1898, voters had selected Mineola to become the county seat for the new county (before Mineola incorporated as a village in 1906 and set its boundaries almost entirely within the Town of North Hempstead), winning out over Hicksville and Hempstead.
The Garden City Company (founded in 1893 by the heirs of Alexander Turney Stewart) donated four acres of land for the county buildings in the Town of Hempstead, just south of the Mineola train station and the present day village of Mineola. The land and the buildings have a Mineola postal address, but are within the present day Village of Garden City, which did not incorporate, nor set its boundaries, until 1919.

In 1917, the village of Glen Cove was granted a city charter, making it independent from the Town of Oyster Bay. In 1918, the village of Long Beach was incorporated in the Town of Hempstead. In 1922, it became a city, making it independent of the town. These are the only two administrative divisions in Nassau County identified as cities.

From the early 1900s until the Depression and the early 1930s, many hilly farmlands on the North Shore were transformed into luxurious country estates for wealthy New Yorkers, with the area receiving the "Gold Coast" moniker and becoming the setting of F. Scott Fitzgerald's 1925 novel The Great Gatsby. One summer resident of the Gold Coast was President Theodore Roosevelt, at Sagamore Hill. In 1908, William Kissam Vanderbilt constructed the Long Island Motor Parkway as a toll road through Nassau County. With overpasses and bridges to remove intersections, it was among the first limited access motor highways in the world, and was also used as a racecourse to test the capabilities of the fledgling automobile industry.

Nassau County, with its extensive flat land, was the site of many aviation firsts. Military aviators for both World Wars were trained on the Hempstead Plains at installations such as Mitchel Air Force Base, and a number of successful aircraft companies were established. Charles Lindberg took off for Paris from Roosevelt Field in 1927, completing the first non-stop trans-Atlantic flight from the United States. Grumman (which in 1986 employed 23,000 people on Long Island) built many planes for World War II, and later contributed the Apollo Lunar Module to the Space program.

The United Nations Security Council was temporarily located in Nassau County from 1946 to 1951. Council meetings were held at the Sperry Gyroscope headquarters in the village of Lake Success near the border with Queens County. It was here on June 27, 1950, that the Security Council voted to back U.S. President Harry S Truman and send a coalition of forces to the Korean Peninsula, leading to the Korean War.

Until World War II, most of Nassau County was still farmland, particularly in the eastern portion. Following the war, the county saw an influx of people from the five boroughs of New York City, especially from Brooklyn and Queens, who left their urban dwellings for a more suburban setting. This led to a massive population boom in the county. In 1947, William Levitt built his first planned community in Nassau County, in the Island Trees section (later renamed Levittown; this should not be confused with the county's first planned community, in general, which is Garden City). While in the 1930s, Robert Moses had engineered curving parkways and parks such as Jones Beach State Park and Bethpage State Park for the enjoyment of city-dwellers, in the 1950s and 1960s the focus turned to alleviating commuter traffic.

In 1994, Federal Judge Arthur Spatt declared the Nassau County Board of Supervisors unconstitutional and directed that a 19-member legislature be formed. Republicans won 13 seats in the election and chose Bruce Blakeman as the first Presiding Officer (Speaker).
Among the first class of Legislators were Peter J. Schmitt (R-Massapequa), Judith Jacobs (D-Woodbury), John Ciotti (R-North Valley Stream), Dennis Dunne Sr. (R-Levittown), Francis X. Becker (R-Lynbrook), Vincent T. Muscarella (R-West Hempstead), Ed Mangano (R-Bethpage), Michael Fiechter (C-North Bellmore), Roger Corbin (D-Westbury), Salvatore Pontillo (R-Farmingdale), Bruce Nyman (D-Long Beach), Edward Ward (R-Wantagh), Darlene Harris (R-Uniondale), Ed Oppenheimer (D-Rockville Centre), John Canning (R-Sea Cliff), Bruce Blakeman (R-Woodmere), Lisanne Altmann (D-Great Neck), Richard Nicolello (R-New Hyde Park), Barbara Johnson (D-Port Washington).

According to a Forbes magazine 2012 survey, residents of Nassau County have the 12th highest median household annual income in the country and the highest in the state. In the 1990s, however, Nassau County experienced substantial budget problems, forcing the county to near bankruptcy. Thus, the county government increased taxes to prevent a takeover by the state of New York, leading to the county having high property taxes. Nevertheless, on January 27, 2011, a State of New York oversight board seized control of Nassau County's finances, saying the wealthy and heavily taxed county had failed to balance its $2.6 billion budgets.

Geography

Nassau County occupies a portion of Long Island immediately east of the New York City borough of Queens. It is divided into two cities and three towns, the latter of which contain 64 villages and numerous hamlets. The county borders Connecticut across the Long Island Sound.

Between the 1990 U.S. census and the 2000 U.S. census, the Nassau County exchanged territory with Suffolk County and lost territory to Queens County. Dozens of CDPs had boundaries changed, and 12 new CDPs were listed.

Countyscape

Climate
Nassau County has a climate similar to other coastal areas of the Northeastern United States; it has warm, humid summers and cool, wet winters. The county is classified as humid subtropical (Cfa) by some definitions, particularly closer to Queens and on the south coast (other areas of Nassau have a hot-summer humid continental climate (Dfa)). A significant portion of the western area of the county is Cfa due to being downwind from the urban heat island effect of New York City. The winters used to be colder with more snowstorms, but have warmed due to climate change. The Atlantic Ocean helps bring afternoon sea breezes that temper the heat in the warmer months and limit the frequency and severity of thunderstorms. Nassau County has a moderately sunny climate, averaging between 2,400 and 2,800 hours of sunshine annually. Average monthly temperatures in Mineola range from 31.9 °F in January to 74.9 °F in July. PRISM Climate Group, Oregon State U The hardiness zones are 7b and 7a.

Adjacent counties
Nassau County borders the following counties:
 Fairfield County, Connecticut – north (maritime boundary)
 Queens County – west
 Suffolk County – east
 Westchester County – northwest (maritime boundary)
 Bronx County— northwest (maritime boundary)

Transportation
In July 2017, the approval was granted by state legislators to the plan proposed by New York Governor Andrew Cuomo to add a third railroad track to the Long Island Rail Road corridor between the communities of Floral Park and Hicksville in Nassau County. The nearly US$2 billion transportation infrastructure enhancement project was expected to accommodate anticipated growth in rail ridership and facilitate commutes between New York City and Nassau and Suffolk counties on Long Island.

The Long Island Expressway, Northern State Parkway, and Southern State Parkway are the primary east–west controlled-access highways in Nassau County. Northern Boulevard (New York State Route 25A), Hillside Avenue (New York State Route 25B), Jericho Turnpike (New York State Route 25), New York State Route 24, and Sunrise Highway (New York State Route 27) are also major east–west commercial thoroughfares across the county. The Meadowbrook State Parkway, Wantagh State Parkway, and Seaford-Oyster Bay Expressway (New York State Route 135) are the major north–south controlled-access highways traversing Nassau County.

Nassau County also has a public bus network known as NICE (Nassau Inter-County Express, formerly MTA Long Island Bus) that operates routes throughout the county into Queens and Suffolk counties. 24 hour service is provided on the n4, n6, and most recently the n40/41 lines.

National protected areas
 Oyster Bay National Wildlife Refuge
 Sagamore Hill National Historic Site
Lido Beach Wildlife Management Area, a part of the Long Island National Wildlife Refuge Complex

Demographics

At the 2019 American Community Survey, the population of Nassau County stood at 1,356,924, an increase of 17,392 since the 2010 census. At the 2010 U.S. census, there were 1,339,532 people, 448,528 households, and 340,523 families residing in the county. The population of Nassau County was estimated by the U.S. Census Bureau to have increased by 2.2% to 1,369,514 in 2017, representing 6.9% of the census-estimated State of New York population of 19,849,399 and 17.4% of the census-estimated Long Island population of 7,869,820. At the 2000 United States census, there were 1,334,544 people, 447,387 households, and 347,172 families residing in the county.

In 2010, there were 340,523 family households, out of which 33.5% had children under the age of 18 living with them, 60.0% were married couples living together, 11.7% had a female householder with no husband present, and 24.1% were non-families. 20.1% of all households were made up of individuals, and 15.1% had someone living alone who was 65 years of age or older. The average household size was 2.94 and the average family size was 3.38. The population was 23.3% under the age of 18, and 18.7% who were 62 years of age or older. The median age was 41.1 years. For every 100 females, there were 93.7 males. For every 100 females age 18 and over, there were 90.4 males. In 2019, there were 474,165 housing units and 446,977 family households. From 2015 to 2019, there was an average of 2.99 persons per household, and 21.4% of the population was under 18 years of age.

At the 2019 American Community Survey, Nassau had a median household income of $116,100 and a per capita income of $51,422. About 5.6% of the population lived at or below the poverty line. The median income for a household in the county in 2010 was $72,030, and the median income for a family was $81,246 (these figures had risen to $87,658 and $101,661 respectively according to a 2007 estimate. Males had a median income of $52,340 versus $37,446 for females. The per capita income for the county was $32,151. About 3.50% of families and 5.20% of the population were below the poverty line, including 5.80% of those under age 18 and 5.60% of those age 65 or over.

The population density in 2010 was 4,700 people per square mile (1,815/km2).

Race and ethnicity 

In 2010, the racial makeup of the county was 73.0% White (65.5% non-Hispanic white), 10.1% African American, 0.2% Native American, 7.6% Asian (3.0% Indian, 1.8% Chinese, 1.0% Korean, 0.7% Filipino, 0.1% Japanese, 0.1% Vietnamese, 0.9% Other Asian), 0.03% Pacific Islander, 5.6% from other races, and 2.4% from two or more races. Hispanics or Latinos of any race were 15.6% of the population. In 2019, Nassau County's racial and ethnic makeup was 58.2% non-Hispanic white, 11.3% Black or African American, 0.2% American Indian or Alaska Native, 10.3% Asian, 0.7% some other race, and 1.9% two or more races. The Hispanic and Latin American population increased to 17.5% of the population.

In 2011, there were about 230,000 Jewish people in Nassau County, representing 17.2% of the population, (as compared to 2% of the total U.S. population). Italian Americans also made up a large portion of Nassau's population. The five most reported ancestries were Italian (23%), Irish (14%), German (7%), Indian (5%), and Polish (4%). The county's population was highest at the 1970 U.S. census. More recently, a Little India community has emerged in Hicksville, Nassau County, spreading eastward from the more established Little India enclaves in Queens. Rapidly growing Chinatowns have developed in Brooklyn and Queens, as did earlier European immigrants, such as the Irish and Italians. As of 2019, the Asian population in Nassau County had grown by 39% since 2010 to an estimated 145,191 individuals, including approximately 50,000 Indian Americans and 40,000 Chinese Americans, as Nassau County has become the leading suburban destination in the U.S. for Chinese immigrants. Likewise, the Long Island Koreatown originated in Flushing, Queens, and is expanding eastward along Northern Boulevard and into Nassau County. The New York Times cited a 2002 study by the non-profit group ERASE Racism, which determined that Nassau, and its neighboring county, Suffolk, as the most de facto racially segregated suburbs in the United States.

Law enforcement

County police services are provided by the Nassau County Police Department. The cities of Glen Cove and Long Beach, as well as a number of villages, are not members of the county police district and maintain their own police forces. The following village police departments exist in Nassau County: Centre Island, Floral Park, Freeport, Garden City, Great Neck Estates, Hempstead, Kensington, Kings Point, Lake Success, Lynbrook, Malverne, Muttontown, Old Brookville (Old Brookville P.D. provides police protection for Old Brookville, Brookville, Upper Brookville, Matinecock, Mill Neck and Cove Neck), Old Westbury, Oyster Bay Cove, Rockville Centre and Sands Point. The Port Washington Police District is not a village department but is authorized by a special district, the only such district in the State of New York. These smaller forces, however, make use of such specialized county police services as the police academy and the aviation unit. Also, all homicides in the county are investigated by the county police, regardless of whether or not they occur within the police district.

On June 1, 2011, the Muttontown Police Department commenced operations. The Old Brookville Police had formerly provided police services to the Village of Muttontown.

In 2006, village leaders in the county seat of Mineola expressed dissatisfaction with the level of police coverage provided by the county force and actively explored seceding from the police district and having the village form its own police force. A referendum on December 5, 2006, however, decisively defeated the proposal.

Since the Long Island State Parkway Police was disbanded in 1980, all of Nassau County's state parkways have been patrolled by Troop L of the New York State Police. State parks in Nassau are patrolled by the New York State Park Police. In 1996, the Long Island Rail Road Police Department was consolidated into the Metropolitan Transportation Authority Police. The MTA Police patrol Long Island Rail Road tracks, stations and properties. The New York State Department of Environmental Conservation Police provides enforcement of state environmental laws and regulations. The State University of New York Police provides enforcement for SUNY Old Westbury.

The Nassau County Police Department posts the mug shots of DWI offenders as press releases on their website. This practice has come under the scrutiny of residents, media, and those pictured in these press releases. This practice has been criticized as being able to cost potential employees, students, or public figures their positions.

County correctional services and enforcement of court orders are provided by the Nassau County Sheriff's Department. New York State Court Officers provide security for courthouses.

The Nassau County Auxiliary Police are a unit of the Nassau County Police Department. These volunteer police officers are assigned to 1 of 38 local community units and perform routine patrols of the neighborhood and provide traffic control for local parades, races and other community events. Auxiliary Police officers are empowered to make arrests for crimes that occur in their presence. Nassau County Auxiliary Police are required to complete a 42-week training course at the Nassau County Police Academy and qualified officers are also offered Emergency Medical Technician (EMT) training. Auxiliary Police officers are certified and registered by the New York Division of Criminal Justice Services as full-time "peace officers". The City of Long Beach has an independent auxiliary police force which is part of its municipal police force. These officers are represented by the Auxiliary Police Benevolent Association of Long Island.

Fire departments
Nassau County is currently protected and served by 71 independent volunteer or combination paid/volunteer fire departments, organized into 9 battalions. The Nassau County Fire Commission also provides logistical support to all 71 departments.
 1st Battalion

 2nd Battalion

 3rd Battalion

 4th Battalion

 5th Battalion

 6th Battalion

 7th Battalion

 8th Battalion

 9th Battalion

Law and government

The head of the county's governmental structure is the county executive, a post created in Nassau County in 1938. The current county executive is Bruce Blakeman, a Republican who was elected in 2021. The chief deputy county executive is Republican Arthur Walsh. The district attorney is Republican Anne T. Donnelly, who was elected in 2021 replacing Acting District Attorney Joyce Smith who succeeded Madeline Singas after she was nominated and confirmed as an associate judge on the New York Court of Appeals in June 2021. Kathleen Rice, who served as the district attorney prior to Singas, was elected to the House of Representatives. The county comptroller is Elaine Phillips, a Republican who formerly served in the New York State Senate; the county clerk is Republican Maureen O'Connell. Former elected offices chairman of the County Board of Assessors, county treasurer, and county sheriff were made appointed and serve at the pleasure of the county executive (county assessor in 2008 via referendum changing it from a six-year term to appointed).

County executive
The current Nassau County executive is Bruce Blakeman, a Republican.

Chief deputy county executive 
The chief deputy county executive is the highest appointed official in the Nassau County government, serving second-in-command under the auspice of the county executive. The Chief Deputy is responsible for managing the activities of all departments of the Nassau County government, which provides services to its 1.36 million residents. The chief deputy also officially serves as the acting county executive in the absence of, or disability of the County Executive. The current chief deputy county executive is Arthur T. Walsh, who was appointed by Executive Bruce Blakeman in 2022.

Comptroller
The comptroller of Nassau County is the chief fiscal officer and chief auditing officer of the County who presides over the Nassau County Comptroller's Office. The comptroller is elected countywide to a four-year term and has no term limit.

* George Maragos was originally elected as a Republican, but became a Democrat in September, 2016.

County legislature

The county legislature has 19 members. There are twelve Republicans and seven Democrats.

Politics

|}

For most of the twentieth century, residents of Nassau County and neighboring Suffolk County primarily supported the Republican Party in national elections. However, the county began trending Democratic in the 1990s, like many of New York City's suburbs. It has voted for a Democrat in every presidential election since 1992. Bill Clinton carried the county in 1992 and 1996, as did Al Gore in 2000, the latter two times by margins of nearly 20 points. John Kerry's margin in Nassau County was considerably slimmer (5.6%) in 2004, as he won the towns of Hempstead and North Hempstead but lost the town of Oyster Bay. The county went solidly for Barack Obama in 2008 and 2012, both times by around 8%. Hillary Clinton did marginally worse in 2016, winning by 6.2%. Joe Biden in 2020 fared better than Obama at 9.5%, but still not as well as Bill Clinton and Gore.

Democratic strength is chiefly concentrated in both the wealthier and lower income sections of the county. Liberal voters dominate many of the wealthy communities of the North Shore, particularly in the Town of North Hempstead where affluent villages such as Sands Point, Old Westbury, Roslyn, East Hills, Kensington, Thomaston, Great Neck Plaza, and Great Neck Estates as well as the neighboring City of Glen Cove vote consistently Democratic. Democratic strongholds also include several low income municipalities in the central portion of the county, such as the Village of Hempstead, Roosevelt, Uniondale and New Cassel, as well as in a few waterfront communities on the South Shore, such as the City of Long Beach and the Village of Freeport.

Republican voters are primarily concentrated in the middle to upper middle class southeastern portion of the county, which developed during the "post-war boom era." Heavily Republican communities such as Massapequa, Massapequa Park, Seaford, Wantagh, Levittown, Bethpage, and Farmingdale are the political base of many county GOP officials such as Congressman Peter T. King and former County Executive Edward P. Mangano. In the western portion of the county, wealthy Garden City is solidly Republican, as is the more middle-class community of Floral Park. Additionally, some of the more rustic areas of the North Shore, particularly in the Town of Oyster Bay usually vote for the GOP.

Areas of the county containing large numbers of swing voters include East Meadow, Oceanside, and Rockville Centre on the South Shore and Mineola on the North Shore. Several areas have changed in partisan affiliation. Formerly Democratic strongholds such as the Five Towns and parts of Great Neck have trended to the GOP while previously Republican areas such as Elmont, Valley Stream and Baldwin have become Democratic bastions.

Although the county leans Democratic at the national level, Republicans swept all three of its U.S. House seats in the 2022 elections. George Santos represents the North Shore along with Mineola and Massapequa, Anthony D'Esposito represents the South Shore along with Hempstead, and Andrew Garbarino represents a sliver of the county's southeastern portion. 

Seven out of Long Island's nine state senators are Republican at the start of the 2017–2019 legislative term in January 2017, with the exceptions being State Senator John Brooks and Senator Todd Kaminsky.

Education
Nassau County has 58 public school districts, which like post office districts use the same names as a city, hamlet, or village within them, but each sets the boundaries independently. The number of districts and communities do not coincide, therefore the boundaries cannot be the same, and residences often have postal addresses that differ from the name of the hamlet and/or school district in which they are located.

School districts include:

K-12:

 Amityville Union Free School District
 Baldwin Union Free School District
 Bethpage Union Free School District
 Carle Place Union Free School District
 Cold Spring Harbor Central School District
 East Meadow Union Free School District
 East Rockaway Union Free School District
 East Williston Union Free School District
 Farmingdale Union Free School District
 Freeport Union Free School District
 Garden City Union Free School District
 Glen Cove City School District
 Great Neck Union Free School District
 Hempstead Union Free School District
 Herricks Union Free School District
 Hewlett-Woodmere Union Free School District
 Hicksville Union Free School District
 Island Park Union Free School District
 Island Trees Union Free School District
 Jericho Union Free School District
 Lawrence Union Free School District
 Levittown Union Free School District
 Locust Valley Central School District
 Long Beach City School District
 Lynbrook Union Free School District
 Malverne Union Free School District
 Manhasset Union Free School District
 Massapequa Union Free School District
 Mineola Union Free School District
 North Shore Central School District
 Oceanside Union Free School District
 Oyster Bay-East Norwich Central School District
 Plainedge Union Free School District
 Plainview-Old Bethpage Central School District
 Port Washington Union Free School District
 Rockville Centre Union Free School District
 Roosevelt Union Free School District
 Roslyn Union Free School District
 Seaford Union Free School District
 Syosset Central School District
 Uniondale Union Free School District
 Wantagh Union Free School District
 West Hempstead Union Free School District
 Westbury Union Free School District

Secondary:
 Bellmore-Merrick Central High School District
 Sewanhaka Central High School District
 Valley Stream Central High School District

Elementary:

 Bellmore Union Free School District
 Elmont Union Free School District
 Floral Park-Bellerose Union Free School District
 Franklin Square Union Free School District
 Merrick Union Free School District
 New Hyde Park-Garden City Park Union Free School District
 North Bellmore Union Free School District
 North Merrick Union Free School District
 Valley Stream Union Free School District 13
 Valley Stream Union Free School District 24
 Valley Stream Union Free School District 30

Colleges and universities

United States Service Academy
United States Merchant Marine Academy – Kings Point
 State University of New York
Nassau Community College – Garden City
SUNY Old Westbury – Old Westbury
 Private

Adelphi University – Garden City
Hofstra University – Hempstead
Donald and Barbara Zucker School of Medicine at Hofstra/Northwell
Maurice A. Deane School of Law
LIU Post – Brookville
Molloy University – Rockville Centre
New York Institute of Technology – Old Westbury
New York Institute of Technology College of Osteopathic Medicine
Webb Institute – Glen Cove

Sports
Nassau County is home to the New York Islanders of the National Hockey League, who played at the Nassau Veterans Memorial Coliseum in Uniondale from their inception in 1972. However, the Islanders announced in 2012 that starting in the fall of 2015, the team would be moving to Brooklyn and would play at the Barclays Center. Due to issues with Barclays Center being unable to adequately support ice hockey and declining attendance, the Islanders announced that for the 2018–19 season they would split their home games between Barclays Center and the newly renovated Nassau Coliseum. In December 2017, the Islanders won a bid to build a new 18,000-seat stadium near Belmont Park in Elmont, returning them to Nassau County, UBS Arena opened in 2021.

The Brooklyn Nets of the National Basketball Association, then known as the New York Nets, formerly played their home games in Nassau County at the now-demolished Island Garden arena in West Hempstead from 1969 to 1972 and then at the Coliseum from 1972 to 1977, before the franchise moved to New Jersey—its original home for several years before coming to Long Island in the late 1960s – and eventually, to Brooklyn.

The New York Cosmos (1970–1985) of the former North American Soccer League (1968–1984) played for two seasons, 1972 and 1973, at Hofstra Stadium at Hofstra University in Hempstead. The team's name was revived in 2010 with the New York Cosmos (2010) of the new North American Soccer League to also play at Hofstra Stadium, which had been renamed James M. Shuart Stadium in 2002. Nassau County is also the home of the New York Lizards of Major League Lacrosse, who play at Shuart Stadium. The county also operates several sports events for student-athletes, such as the Nassau County Executive Cup College Showcase.

Belmont Park in Elmont is a major horse racing venue which annually hosts the Belmont Stakes, the third and final leg of the prestigious Triple Crown of thoroughbred racing. The now-demolished Roosevelt Raceway in Westbury hosted auto racing and, from 1940 through 1988, was a popular harness racing track.

Nassau is home to some famous and historic golf courses. Rockaway Hunting Club, founded in 1878, is the oldest country club in the country. The U.S. Open has been held in Nassau five times, once each at Garden City Golf Club, Inwood Country Club, and Fresh Meadow Country Club, and twice at Bethpage Black Course, the first ever municipally owned course. Courses consistently ranked in the top 100 in the U.S. such as Bethpage Black, Garden City Golf Club, Piping Rock Club, and The Creek are located in the county.

Nassau County hosted the 1984 Summer Paralympics, marking the first Paralympic Games to be held in the United States.

Health
The first case of COVID-19 was reported in March 2020. As of January 12, 2021, there have been 104,078 cases, 3,044 deaths, 2,102,900 tests conducted, and a 4.9% positivity rate. According to The New York Times''' COVID-19 tracker, Nassau County's average daily case count is 1,567 (116 per capita), with 1 in 13 testing positive (the third-worst of any county in the state) and 1 in 545 dying.

Communities

Figures in parentheses are 2019 population estimates from the U.S. Census Bureau.

 Cities 

 Glen Cove (27,166)
 Long Beach (33,454)

Towns

 Hempstead (766,980)
 North Hempstead (230,933)
 Oyster Bay (298,391)

 Villages 

 Atlantic Beach (1,902)
 Baxter Estates (1,049)
 Bayville (6,732)
 Bellerose (1,162)
 Brookville (3,605)
 Cedarhurst (6,633)
 Centre Island (409)
 Cove Neck (301)
 East Hills (7,233)
 East Rockaway (9,814)
 East Williston (2,550)
 Farmingdale (9,002)
 Floral Park (15,844)
 Flower Hill (4,889)
 Freeport (42,956)
 Garden City (22,454)
 Great Neck (10,209)
 Great Neck Estates (2,879)
 Great Neck Plaza (7,027)
 Hempstead (55,113)
 Hewlett Bay Park (429)
 Hewlett Harbor (1,272)
 Hewlett Neck (472)
 Island Park (4,886)
 Kensington (1,189)
 Kings Point (5,292)
 Lake Success (3,144)
 Lattingtown (1,764)
 Laurel Hollow (2,033)
 Lawrence (6,556)
 Lynbrook (19,448)
 Malverne (8,485)
 Manorhaven (6,627)
 Massapequa Park (17,143)
 Matinecock (833)
 Mill Neck (967)
 Mineola (19,207)
 Munsey Park (2,710)
 Muttontown (3,668)
 New Hyde Park (9,807)
 North Hills (5,969)
 Old Brookville (2,187)
 Old Westbury (4,614)
 Oyster Bay Cove (2,254)
 Plandome (1,466)
 Plandome Heights (1,018)
 Plandome Manor (902)
 Port Washington North (3,199)
 Rockville Centre (24,550)
 Roslyn (2,902)
 Roslyn Estates (1,233)
 Roslyn Harbor (1,108)
 Russell Gardens (946)
 Saddle Rock (988)
 Sands Point (2,905)
 Sea Cliff (5,020)
 South Floral Park (1,760)
 Stewart Manor (1,956)
 Thomaston (2,613)
 Upper Brookville (1,744)
 Valley Stream (37,431)
 Westbury (15,351)
 Williston Park (7,253)
 Woodsburgh (780)

 Census-designated places 

 Albertson
 Baldwin
 Barnum Island 
 Bay Park
 Bellerose Terrace
 Bellmore
 Bethpage
 Carle Place
 East Atlantic Beach
 East Garden City (former; now part of Uniondale)
 East Massapequa
 East Meadow
 East Norwich
 Elmont
 Franklin Square
 Garden City Park
 Garden City South
 Glen Head
 Glenwood Landing
 Great Neck Gardens
 Greenvale
 Harbor Hills
 Harbor Isle
 Herricks
 Hewlett
 Hicksville
 Inwood
 Jericho
 Lakeview
 Levittown
 Lido Beach
 Locust Valley
 Malverne Park Oaks
 Manhasset
 Manhasset Hills
 Massapequa
 Merrick
 New Cassel
 North Bellmore
 North Lynbrook
 North Massapequa
 North Merrick
 North New Hyde Park
 North Valley Stream
 North Wantagh
 Oceanside
 Old Bethpage
 Oyster Bay
 Plainedge
 Plainview
 Point Lookout
 Port Washington
 Roosevelt
 Roslyn Heights
 Saddle Rock Estates
 Salisbury
 Seaford 
 Searingtown
 South Farmingdale
 South Floral Park
 South Hempstead
 South Valley Stream
 Syosset
 Uniondale
 University Gardens
 Wantagh
 West Hempstead
 Woodbury
 Woodmere

 Former CDPs 

 Baldwin Harbor (now part of Baldwin)
 East Garden City (now part of Uniondale)
 Locust Grove (now part of Syosset)

 County symbols 
 County bird: Osprey
 County flower: Birdsfoot Violet (Viola pedata)

Notable people
Sean Hannity — Conservative media host. Grew up in Franklin Square, now lives in Centre Island.
Rupert Murdoch — Lived in Centre Island.
Matt Cardona – Professional Wrestler, Lived in Nassau County
Brian Myers – Professional Wrestler, Lived in Nassau County
Jon Gabrus – Lived in Nassau County, worked at Jones Beach State Park as a lifeguard.
 Bob Keeshan – (Captain Kangaroo) was born in Lynbrook
 Ben Cohen & Jerry Greenfield – (of Ben & Jerry Ice Cream) both grew up in Merrick
 Kevin James – was born in Mineola
 Tatyana Ali – from North Bellmore 
 Carol Alt – lived in the Willistons 
 Criss Angel – from East Meadow 
 Carmelo Anthony – is said to have a home in Hewlett Harbor
 Marc Anthony – had a home in Brookville, with Jennifer Lopez
 Judd Apatow – raised in Syosset
 Fred Armisen – grew up in Valley Stream
 Ashanti (singer) – native of Glen Cove 
 Dave Attell – raised in Rockville Centre 
 Ruth Bader Ginsburg – lived in Rockville Centre after getting married 
 John Barry (composer) – lived in Oyster Bay 
 The Baldwin brothers-in age order: Alec Baldwin (b. 1958), Daniel Baldwin (b. 1960), William Baldwin (b. 1963), and Stephen Baldwin (b. 1966) – were raised in the Nassau Shores area of Massapequa
 Bruce Blakeman – first Presiding Officer, Port Authority Commissioner, Councilman, County Executive. From Valley Stream, now lives in Atlantic Beach.
 Nikki Blonsky – grew up in Great Neck
 Stephen Boyd (American football) – native of Valley Stream 
 Lorraine Bracco – grew up in Hicksville 
 Nicholas Braun – native of Bethpage 
 Jim Breuer – grew up in Valley Stream
 Jim Brown – grew up in Manhasset 
 Lenny Bruce – native of Mineola and Bellmore 
 William Cullen Bryant – lived at Cedarmere in Roslyn Harbor
 Edward Burns – grew up in Valley Stream
 Steve Buscemi and Michael Buscemi– grew up in Valley Stream
 Cab Calloway – lived in Long Beach for a time 
 Eddie Cantor – lived in Great Neck
 Theresa Caputo – lives in Hicksville 
 William J. Casey – lived in Bellmore and Roslyn Harbor 
 Vernon and Irene Castle – lived in Long Beach 
 Elaine Chao – grew up in Syosset 
 Harry Chapin – lived in Jericho 
 Michael Cimino – grew up in Westbury
 Speedy Claxton – from Hempstead 
 Billy Crystal – is from Long Beach 
 Anthony Cumia – radio host, owns a home in Roslyn Heights
 Chuck D – grew up in Roosevelt 
 Al D'Amato – US Senator, former Hempstead Supervisor, lived in Island Park and Lido Beach
 Michelle DaRosa – also known as Michelle Nolan, grew up in Rockville Centre
 Carson Daly – resides in Flower Hill
 Tony Danza – Native of Malverne
 Candy Darling – lived in Massapequa Park
 Taylor Dayne – grew up in Baldwin 
 Dave DeBusschere – lived in Garden City
 Gary Dell'Abate – native of Uniondale 
 Nelson DeMille – lives in Garden City
 Ted Demme – native of Rockville Centre
 Jonathan Demme – grew up in Baldwin
 Brian Dennehy – grew up in Mineola 
 Tim Dillon – grew up in Island Park
 Mort Drucker – lived in Syosset
 Julius Erving – native of Roosevelt 
 Everlast – grew up in Valley Stream
 Perry Farrell – grew up in Woodmere 
 D'Brickashaw Ferguson – grew up in Freeport
 WC Fields – lived in Great Neck
 Flavor Flav – grew up in Freeport
 Whitey Ford – lived in Glen Cove 
 Mike Francesa – radio host. Born in Long Beach, lives in Flower Hill
 Bev Francis – IFBB professional Australian female bodybuilder, powerlifter, and national shot put champion; lives in Syosset
 Steve Weinberger – IFBB judge and powerlifter and husband of Bev Francis; lives in Syosset
 William Gaddis – grew up in Massapequa; later lived in East Hampton
 John R. Gambling – radio host; lifelong county resident
 Joe Gatto (comedian) – lives in Lynbrook
 Pamela Geller – blogger, author, political activist, and commentator
 Debbie Gibson – grew up in Merrick 
 Danny Green – played high school basketball in Manhasset
 Ellie Greenwich – lived in Levittown 
 Bill Griffith – raised in Levittown 
 Steve Guttenberg – raised in North Massapequa
 Tobias Harris – basketball player for the Philadelphia 76ers, lives in Syosset
 John Hampson of Nine Days – lives in Wantagh 
 George "Gabby" Hayes – lived in Baldwin 
 Joey Heatherton – grew up in Rockville Centre
 Ray Heatherton – lived in Rockville Centre
 William S. Hofstra – lived in Hempstead 
 Red Holzman – lived in Cedarhurst 
 Al Iaquinta – grew up in Valley Stream
 Dan Ingram – native of Oceanside 
 Joan Jett – lives in Long Beach
 Billy Joel – grew up in Hicksville, and has a home in Centre Island
 Christine Jorgensen – lived in Massapequa Park 
 JWoww – lived in Franklin Square 
 Donna Karen – raised in Woodmere
 Andy Kaufman – raised in Great Neck and Westbury 
 Charlie Kaufman – grew up in Massapequa 
 Wendy Kaufman – lived in North Woodmere
 Doris Kearns Goodwin – lived in Rockville Centre
 Greg Kelly – native of Rockville Centre
 Alicia Keys – once had a home in Muttontown
 Jack Kirby – lived in Hewlett Harbor
 Aline Kominsky-Crumb – native of Long Beach 
 Michael Kors – grew up in Merrick 
 Sandy Koufax – lived in Rockville Centre
 Ron Kovic – from Massapequa 
 Ed Kranepool – lives in Old Westbury 
 Paul Krugman – grew up in Merrick 
 Tim Kubart – of Postmodern Jukebox is from Farmingdale 
 Ray Kump – grew up in Island Park
 Jesse Lacey – native of Levittown 
 Erik Larson (author) – lived in Freeport
 Cyndi Lauper – briefly lived in Valley Stream 
 Adam Lazzara – lived in Bellmore 
 Stan Lee – lived in Hewlett Harbor
 Carol Leifer – grew up in East Williston 
 The Lemon Twigs – based out of Hicksville 
 John Lennon – briefly lived in Laurel Hollow
 Alan Jay Lerner – lived in Centre Island 
 Wendy Liebman – grew up in East Hills
 Scott Lipsky (born 1981) – tennis player, born in Hempstead
 Peggy Lipton – raised in Lawrence 
 Lindsay Lohan – her family resides in North Merrick
 Guy Lombardo – lived in Freeport
 Jennifer Lopez – had a home in Brookville, with Marc Anthony
 Susan Lucci – soap opera star grew up and still has a residence in Garden City
 Chuck Lorre – native of Plainview 
 Lori Loughlin – raised in Oceanside 
 Elliot S. Maggin – DC Comics writer lived in Merrick 
 The Marx Brothers – lived in Great Neck
 Jackie Martling – grew up in Mineola 
 Christopher Masterson and Danny Masterson are from East Williston 
 John McEnroe – lived in Cove Neck
 Michael McKean – raised in Sea Cliff 
 Kate McKinnon of Saturday Night Live'' – grew up in Sea Cliff
 Anne Meara – raised in Rockville Centre
 John Melendez – Stuttering John from Howard Stern show – from Massapequa 
 Idina Menzel – from Syosset 
 Method Man – lived in Hempstead
 Steve Madden – grew up in Lawrence 
 Larry Miller – grew up in Valley Stream
 Harvey Milk – native of Woodmere and Hewlett 
 MF Doom – lived in Long Beach 
 Eddie Money lived in Levittown 
 Les Moonves – grew up in Valley Stream 
 Rita Moreno – lived in North Valley Stream 
 Errol Morris – grew up in Hewlett 
 Sterling Morrison – native of East Meadow 
 John Moschitta Jr. – native of Uniondale 
 Charlie Murphy – grew up in Roosevelt
 Eddie Murphy – grew up in Roosevelt 
 Elliott Murphy – from Rockville Centre
 Billy Murray (singer) – lived in Freeport
 John Nolan (musician) – grew up in Rockville Centre
 Ole Olsen (comedian) – lived for a time in Malverne
 Momina Mustehsan – Pakistani singer, engineer; lives part-time in Nassau County
 Bill O'Reilly – resides in Plandome; grew up in Westbury
 Daryl Palumbo – lived in Bellmore
 Adam Pascal – lived in Woodbury 
 Slim Jim Phantom – grew up in Massapequa 
 Natalie Portman – actress, grew up in Syosset
 Gary Portnoy – lived in North Woodmere 
 C.W. Post and his daughter Marjorie Merriweather Post lived in Brookville. Her daughter, actress Dina Merrill spent time there too 
 Thomas Pynchon – born in Glen Cove and grew up in Oyster Bay
 pH-1 – singer and rapper, grew up on Long Island
 Prodigy (rapper) – native of Hempstead 
 Lee Ranaldo – native of Glen Cove 
 Lou Reed – Grew up in Freeport
 Busta Rhymes – from Uniondale
 Joel Rifkin – lived in East Meadow 
 Theodore Roosevelt, 26th US president, lived on Oyster Bay during his presidency. His estate, Sagamore Hill, is now a US National Historic Site
 Eleanor Roosevelt and her father Elliott Roosevelt lived in Salisbury 
 Jeff Rosenstock – from Baldwin 
 Lonny Ross – native of Wantagh 
 Bob Rozakis and Laurie Rozakis live in the town of Oyster Bay
 Rick Rubin – grew up in Lido Beach 
 Scott Rudin – from Baldwin 
 Chris Russo – from Syosset 
 Telly Savalas – native of Garden City
 Shaggy – lives in Valley Stream
 Jerry Seinfeld – grew up in Massapequa
 Brian Setzer – grew up in Massapequa
 Amy Schumer – from Oceanside
 Adrienne Shelly – grew up in Jericho 
 Kevin Shinick – native of Merrick 
 Jamie-Lynn Sigler – native of Jericho 
 Helen Slater – from Bethpage 
 Elinor Smith – lived in Freeport
 Greg Smith (American musician) – grew up in Valley Stream 
 Dee Snider – native of Baldwin 
 Lara Spencer – native of Garden City 
 Frank Springer – grew up in Malverne 
 Howard Stern – grew up in Roosevelt 
 Jim Steinman – native of Hewlett 
 Laura Stevenson – lived in Rockville Centre 
 Brandon Tartikoff - raised in Freeport
 Taz (wrestler) – lived in Massapequa 
 John Tesh – native of Garden City 
 Vinny Testaverde – grew up in Elmont
 LaMarcus Adna Thompson – lived in Glen Cove 
 Louis Comfort Tiffany – lived in Laurel Hollow 
 Moe Tucker – grew up in Levittown 
 Reginald VelJohnson – lives in Oceanside 
 Frank Viola – native of East Meadow 
 James Watson – lives in Laurel Hallow
 Chris Weidman – Mixed martial artist and former middleweight champion in the UFC (honored with 'Chris Weidman Day' on July 17 in Nassau County)
 Leslie West – grew up in East Meadow and Lawrence 
 Walt Whitman – lived in Hempstead 
 Robin Wilson (musician) – Lives in Valley Stream 
 Paul Zaloom – native of Garden City 
 Alan Zweibel – lived in Woodmere and Wantagh 
 Levar Stoney – mayor of Richmond, Virginia; was born in Nassau County

See also

 List of counties in New York
 List of Long Islanders
 Nassau County Police Department
 Nassau County Sports Commission
 Nassau Inter-County Express
 National Register of Historic Places listings in Nassau County, New York

References

External links

 Nassau County official website
 Nassau County Photo Gallery
 Nassau Cadet Squadron 8 – Civil Air Patrol
 PDF map showing LI school district boundaries and wealth comparisons
 Best Places To Live in Nassau County, NY
 History of Nassau County on county website
 Map of fire stations in Nassau County 

 
1899 establishments in New York (state)
Counties in the New York metropolitan area
Long Island Sound
Populated places established in 1899
William III of England